Tortuga Bay is located on the Santa Cruz Island, about a 20-minute water-taxi ride from the main water taxi dock in Puerto Ayora. Visitors must sign in and out at the start of the path with the Galapagos Park Service office. Tortuga Bay has a gigantic, perfectly preserved beach that is forbidden to swimmers and is preserved for the wildlife where many marine iguanas, galapagos crabs and birds are seen dotted along the volcanic rocks. There is a separate cove where you can swim where it is common to view white tip reef sharks  swimming in groups and on occasion tiger sharks  

There is always a large variety of small fish, birds, including the brown pelican and gigantic galápagos tortoise. The Galápagos Islands were discovered in 1535, but first appeared on the maps, of Gerardus Mercator and Abraham Ortelius, in about 1570. The islands were named "Insulae de los Galopegos" (Islands of the Tortoises) in reference to the giant tortoises found there.

Gallery

See also
 List of beaches

Notes

References

Galapagos Nacional Park, Tortuga Bay http://www.galapagospark.org/sitio.php?page=bahia_tortuga ecuador-travel.net  
Tortuga Bay, Galapagos http://www.ecuador-travel.net/galapagos.site.tortugabay.htm
Galapagos Nacional Park on galapagos.org http://www.galapagos.org

Galápagos Islands task force articles
Galápagos Islands
Landforms of Galápagos Province
Bays of Ecuador
Tourist attractions in Galápagos Province